The men's pole vault event at the 1982 Commonwealth Games was held on 8 October at the QE II Stadium in Brisbane, Australia.

Results

References

Results (The Canberra Times)
Australian results 

Athletics at the 1982 Commonwealth Games
1982